Loren Janes (October 1, 1931 – June 24, 2017) was an American stuntman, notable for his work in Hollywood films, particularly those starring Steve McQueen, including Bullitt, Nevada Smith, and The Hunter. He also co-founded the Stuntmen's Association of Motion Pictures in 1961. In 1956, he was the first civilian to enter the United States Olympic Trials for pentathlon; he also competed in 1964. He is a member of the Hollywood Stuntmen's Hall of Fame.

He also has a footnote contribution to television, having played the role of Norman Chaney on the TV series L.A. Law. In the first scene of the first episode, Chaney is found dead, though his name appears for years in the name of the law firm.

Janes died at age 85 on June 24, 2017.  He was said by his family to have suffered from Alzheimer's disease.

Filmography

References

External links

Official website

1931 births
2017 deaths
American stunt performers
Entertainers from California
People from Sierra Madre, California
Deaths from dementia in California
Deaths from Alzheimer's disease